"The Sycamore Tree" is a song recorded by Canadian country music artist Paul Brandt. It was released in 2000 as the fourth single from his third studio album, That's the Truth. It peaked at number 7 on the RPM Country Tracks chart in April 2000.

Chart performance

References

2000 singles
Paul Brandt songs
Reprise Records singles
Song recordings produced by Chris Farren (country musician)
Songs written by Paul Brandt
1999 songs